The Cluster Munitions Ban Advocates are a group of individuals whose lives have been affected by cluster munitions, a particular type of explosive weapon that has been banned for its indiscriminate area effects and risk from unexploded ordnance. They come from Afghanistan, Albania, Cambodia, Croatia, Ethiopia, Iraq, Laos, Lebanon, Tajikistan, Serbia and Vietnam. The Ban Advocates took an active role in the Oslo Process on cluster munitions that led to the Convention on Cluster Munitions, a treaty banning cluster munitions and providing innovative provisions to assist the victims of these weapons. The Ban Advocates initiative was launched in October 2007 by Handicap International Belgium, a founding member of the Nobel Peace Prize-winning International Campaign to Ban Landmines. The Ban Advocates spoke in front of the international community on many occasions. According to the Irish Minister for Justice, "The indomitable spirit of the Ban Advocates, overcoming terrible injuries to bear witness to the horrors of cluster munitions, inspired us throughout." The Ban Advocates blog provides regular updates on their work around the world.

See also
 Cluster bomb
 Cluster Munition Coalition
 Convention on Cluster Munitions
 Handicap International
 International Campaign to Ban Landmines
 Fares Scale of Injuries due to Cluster Munitions

References
 "Afghanistan Signs Cluster Bomb Treaty"
 Ban Advocates Blog
 Circle of Impact: The Fatal Footprint of Cluster Munitions on People and Communities
 Closing statement by the United Kingdom, Dublin, 30 May 2008
 Cluster Munition Coalition
 Fatal Footprint - photo exhibition on the human impact of landmines and cluster munitions
 Handicap International Belgium
 International Campaign to Ban Landmines
 Official website of the Convention on Cluster Munitions
  Speech by Irish Minister for Justice, Oslo, 3 December 2008
 “Victim Assistance and the Oslo Process on Cluster Munitions”
 "What do survivors think of cluster munitions?"

Cluster munition
Human rights organisations based in Belgium